The London and North Western Railway (LNWR) George the Fifth Class  was a class of 4-4-0 passenger steam locomotive.

History
The locomotives were introduced during July 1910 by Charles Bowen-Cooke following the succession of George V, construction continued until 1915.  They were essentially superheated versions of the LNWR Whale Precursor Class.  At the same time, similar non-superheated Queen Mary Class engines were also built but all of these acquired superheaters as the advantages of superheating became clear and were absorbed into the George the Fifth Class.

A total of 90 Georges were built, and all were named. The LNWR reused names and numbers from withdrawn locomotives, with the result that the numbering system was completely haphazard.

All of the Georges passed into London, Midland and Scottish Railway (LMS) ownership on the grouping in 1923. The LMS gave them the power classification 3P. The LMS renumbered them into a more logical series of 5320–5409, and later in 1936/37 those had not been then withdrawn were again renumbered by the addition of 20000 into the 25320–25409 series to make room for Black Fives. It was also at this time that a few of the names were removed so that they could be applied to new LMS Jubilee Class engines.

Withdrawals started in 1935, and by 1939 only nine remained. British Railways (BR) inherited three in 1948: 25321, which was withdrawn in February that year, and 25350 and 25373, which were allocated the BR numbers 58011/2 in March but never carried them as both were withdrawn in May that year. None have been preserved.

Accidents and incidents

On 14 August 1915, locomotive No. 1489 Wolfhound was hauling a passenger train when it suffered a mechanical failure in its motion, with the result that the opposite track was damaged. A mail train was derailed on the damaged track at Weedon, Northamptonshire. Ten people were killed and 21 were injured.

New Build Locomotive

The George the Fifth Steam Trust is building a George the Fifth class locomotive named after Prince George.

List of Locomotives

See also
 LNWR Prince of Wales Class
 LNWR Claughton Class

Notes

References
"LNWR George the Fifth Trust- Homepage"

External links
 LNWR George the Fifth Steam Locomotive Trust George the Fifth Class Coronation name plate showing the locomotive was the 5000th engine built at Crewe Works
 LNWR Society Photographs of the Bowen-Cooke 4-4-0 George the Fifth class steam locomotives

George the Fifth
4-4-0 locomotives
Railway locomotives introduced in 1910
Standard gauge steam locomotives of Great Britain
Scrapped locomotives
Passenger locomotives